Justin Barcia (born 25 March 1992) is an American motorcycle racer from Monroe, New York. Barcia competes in both AMA Supercross and Motocross Championships.

Career
Barcia began his career by winning back to back 250 Supercross East Championships in 2011 and 2012. Riding for Yamaha until 2019, Barcia has won the season opening race in Anaheim on multiple occasions. Barcia changed teams to race for Gas Gas in 2020.

References

1992 births
Living people
American motorcycle racers
Sportspeople from New York (state)
People from Monroe, New York